Emara is a surname. Notable people with the surname include:

Adel Emara, Egyptian general
Mohamed Emara (born 1974), Egyptian footballer
Saleh Emara (born 1982), Egyptian freestyle wrestler